Kriss Sheridan (born 15 April 1989), is a Polish-American singer, songwriter, actor, model and traveler.

Early life 
A son of a US American father and a Polish mother, as well as a German citizen. His studies took him to Munich, Madrid and New York City, there after working with several television and radio stations such as RTL Television, ProSiebenSat.1 Media, Televisión Española, RFO Television and Radio Bayernwelle in Munich and Madrid. Sheridan has been admitted to the Lee Strasberg Theatre and Film Institute in New York City while doing modeling work.

Career 
His debut single "Happy" came out in March 2017, released by Universal Music. The single peaked at Number-1 on the Polish Music Charts. The music video was shot in Norway and broadcast on MTV and VIVA TV throughout all of Europe and America.

On 6 July 2017, Sheridan performed on Polish Television TVP Polonia to welcome US President Donald Trump on his visit to Poland.

Currently Sheridan is working together with world-class music producers and songwriters from USA, Sweden, France and the Netherlands, including the legendary Alan Roy Scott, who also writes songs for Celine Dion and Cyndi Lauper.

In March 2018, Sheridan released his second single "I Don't Wanna Say Goodbye", which peaked at Number-1 on the Polish Music Charts. The single was an international British-French-Swiss-US American-Polish production, created at a songwriting camp in Spain. The official music video was filmed near Warsaw, Poland and directed by Piotr Smoleński. The music video featured appearances by Agata Borowiak (model and the Miss Polonia 2017 finalist) and dancers from the Agustin Egurrola dance studio.
In October 2018, Sheridan released his third single "Tomorrow". The single peaked at Number-1 on the Polish Music Charts.

Discography

Singles

Music videos

Filmography

References 

Living people
Polish male singers
American male pop singers
1987 births
People from Bielsko-Biała
Polish pop singers
Polish lyricists
American lyricists
21st-century American singers
21st-century Polish singers
21st-century American male singers